Jean-Luc Vasseur (born 1 January 1969) is a French professional football manager and former player who was most recently the manager of FA WSL club Everton.

Career
As a player, Vasseur played with Paris Saint-Germain,  Stade Rennais, Saint-Étienne, Créteil, Racing Paris and FCM Aubervilliers. In June 2014, he was appointed as the new manager of Stade de Reims. Previously he spent three seasons with US Créteil. In 2013, he won the Championnat National with US Créteil. In his first Ligue 1 game, he managed a 2–2 draw with Stade de Reims against defending champions Paris Saint-Germain.

On 7 April 2015, Vasseur was sacked as manager of Stade de Reims.

On 17 June 2019, Vasseur was appointed manager of Lyon Féminin. 

On 28 April 2021, Lyon sacked Vasseur and replaced him with Sonia Bompastor.

On 29 October 2021, Everton Women hired Vasseur as their manager on a contract to June 2024, succeeding Willie Kirk. However, Everton then sacked Vasseur on 1 February 2022, after three losses, two draws, and one win. The Telegraph reported that players were also unhappy with Vasseur's training methods.

Personal life 
Vasseur is the godfather of Francis De Percin's daughter. They were teammates at Paris Saint-Germain.

Honours

Manager
Paris Saint-Germain U17
 Championnat National U17: 2010–11

Créteil
 Championnat National: 2012–13

Lyon Féminin
 UEFA Women's Champions League: 2019–20
 Division 1 Féminine: 2019–20
 Coupe de France Féminine: 2019–20
 Trophée des Championnes: 2019
 Women's International Champions Cup: 2019
Individual
UEFA Women's Coach of the Year: 2019–20
World Soccers Women's World Manager of the Year: 2020
IFFHS World's Best Woman Club Coach: 2020

References

Living people
1969 births
People from Poissy
Footballers from Yvelines
Association football midfielders
Paris Saint-Germain F.C. players
Stade Rennais F.C. players
AS Saint-Étienne players
US Créteil-Lusitanos players
Racing Club de France Football players
FCM Aubervilliers players
Ligue 1 players
Championnat National players
French footballers
French football managers
US Créteil-Lusitanos managers
Stade de Reims managers
Paris FC managers
LB Châteauroux managers
Olympique Lyonnais Féminin managers
Ligue 1 managers
Ligue 2 managers
Women's Super League managers